Pacuí River may refer to:

 Pacuí River (Gorutuba River), a river in Brazil
 Pacuí River (São Francisco River), a river in Brazil